Beit Yosef is a moshav in the northern Israel's Beit She'an Valley. Located about eight kilometres north of Beit She'an, adjacent to Yardena, it falls under the jurisdiction of Valley of Springs Regional Council.

History
Beit Yosef was founded in 1937 as a tower and stockade settlement, a series of settlements erected during the 1936–1939 Arab revolt in Palestine. It was named for Yosef Aharonovitch,  an influential figure in the Labor Party and a journalist. By 1947 it had a population of over 200. Although it was abandoned during the 1948 Arab–Israeli War after it was severely attacked by the Jordanian Arab Legion and Iraqi Army, it was re-established in 1951 by immigrants from Kurdistan and Iraq.

References

Moshavim
Populated places established in 1937
Jewish villages in Mandatory Palestine
Populated places in Northern District (Israel)
1937 establishments in Mandatory Palestine